Ushkovsky (formerly known as Plosky) is a large volcanic massif located in the central part of the Kamchatka Peninsula, Russia. It is located at the northwestern end of the Klyuchevskaya Sopka volcano group. These volcanoes are also set in a chain linked formation. The highest peak of this massif is Krestovsky (4108 m). Krestovsky is a stratovolcano, Ushkovsky is a shield volcano.

View

See also
 List of volcanoes in Russia

References 
 

Mountains of the Kamchatka Peninsula
Volcanoes of the Kamchatka Peninsula
Shield volcanoes of Russia
Complex volcanoes
Stratovolcanoes of Russia